"Can You Hear Me? (Ayayaya)" is a single from British grime artist Wiley, featuring vocals from Skepta, Jme and Ms D. It was released as the second single from his ninth album, The Ascent, on 28 October 2012 for digital download in the United Kingdom. It was written by Richard Cowie, Joseph Adenuga, Jamie Adenuga, Dayo Olatunji and produced by Rymez and Sillkey.

Music video
A music video to accompany the release of "Can You Hear Me? (Ayayaya)" was first released onto YouTube on 4 October 2012 at a total length of three minutes and fifty-three seconds.

Chart performance
"Can You Hear Me? (Ayayaya)" debuted at number 3 on UK chart on 4 November 2012. The song entered the Irish Singles Chart at number 26.

Track listings

Credits and personnel
 Vocals – Wiley, Skepta, Jme & Ms D
 Producer – Rymez & Sillkey
 Lyrics – Richard Cowie, Joseph Adenuga, Jamie Adenuga, Dayo Olatunji

Charts

Weekly charts

Year-end charts

Certifications

Release history

References

2012 songs
2012 singles
Wiley (musician) songs
Skepta songs
Jme (musician) songs
Dyo (singer) songs
Songs written by Wiley (musician)
Songs written by Skepta
Warner Music Group singles